Petar I may refer to:

  Petar I Petrović-Njegoš (1747–1830), Montenegrin ruler, metropolitan and saint
 Peter I of Serbia (1844–1921), Serbian king

See also 
 Peter I (disambiguation)